Louis A. Craco (October 18, 1933 – February 15, 2020) was a New York City lawyer, president of the New York City Bar Association and a life member of the American Law Institute. He was a partner with the law firm Willkie, Farr & Gallagher, later - Craco & Ellsworth. He was a co-founder of the Volunteers of Legal Service (VOLS) of New York City - organization providing pro bono legal services to low income New Yorkers. In 2004 he was awarded a Gold medal from the New York State Bar Association for his numerous contributions to development of the profession.

Life and education

Louis Aloysius Craco Jr. was born on October 18, 1933, in the Bronx. His father was an antique furniture and fine art auctioneer and his mother worked as an elementary-school teacher.

Louis Craco received his Bachelor of Arts degree from Holy Cross College in Worcester, Massachusetts in 1954, and his L.L.B. degree from New York University School of Law in 1957, where he was Notes Editor of NYU Law Review.

Craco died of stroke on February 15, 2020 in Manhasset, NY.

Career

Louis Craco was a partner at the law firm Willkie, Farr and Gallagher from 1964 until 2003, and also served as senior partner in the Litigation Department. His experience included general business litigation, domestic and transnational disputes relating to commercial transactions; contests over control or dissolution of corporations, partnerships and joint ventures; antitrust and trade regulation; intellectual property and unfair competition; financial and accounting issues; environmental matters; transportation equipment and marine financing; banking; insurance; professional liability; securities; bankruptcy and reorganizations.

From 1982 to 1984, he served as president of the New York City Bar Association. In 1984 he co-founded the Volunteers of Legal Service (VOLS) of New York City, in which attorneys provided free services to New Yorkers in need. In 1999 Craco was appointed the Chair of the New York State Judicial Institute on Professionalism in the Law. He also served in the New York State Court of Appeals Committee on the Profession in the Courts.

He was also a fellow of the American College of Trial Lawyers and the American Bar Association. In 2004 he was awarded a Gold medal from the New York State Bar Association - to recognize his high professionalism and numerous contributions to civic and community matters.

Louis Craco was a life member of the American Law Institute.

References

External links 

Biography of Louis Craco at the College of Commercial Arbitrators
Biography of Louis A. Craco at Craco and Ellsworth, LLP

1933 births
2020 deaths
Presidents of the New York City Bar Association
People associated with Willkie Farr & Gallagher
College of the Holy Cross alumni
New York University School of Law alumni